"I, Yi, Yi, Yi, Yi (I Like You Very Much)" is a 1941 song. It was written for the 1941 film That Night in Rio, and was popularized by Carmen Miranda. The lyrics were written by Mack Gordon and the music by Harry Warren.

Covers and performances
The song was recorded by The Andrews Sisters on January 7, 1941.
The 1943 Our Gang comedy Calling All Kids included a performance of this song by Janet Burston, who was impersonating Carmen Miranda.
In 1944, Carmen Miranda reprised the song for the film Four Jills in a Jeep. The film features several stars in a story about USO performers during WWII.
Petula Clark recorded it for her 1957 album You Are My Lucky Star. 
Adrienne Barbeau sang this song as her character Carol Traynor on the sitcom Maude.
Carol Channing sang this song when she appeared on The Muppet Show.
The singer Rita Lee recorded a cover version in the 1980s.
Alvin and the Chipmunks covered this song along with "Cuánto Le Gusta" for their 1987 film The Chipmunk Adventure and its soundtrack.

Other appearances in pop culture
Carmen Miranda is presented with this song in the short film Sing With The Stars, produced by the Army Pictorial Service in 1944, that was years later, included in the documentary Carmen Miranda: Bananas is My Business directed by Helena Solberg.
The song makes an appearance in the series finale of the 1967-68 British television series The Prisoner, then it was parodied in an advert for Kellogg's Fruit 'n Fibre cereal in 1996, and was used in a sequence for the Futurama movie The Beast with a Billion Backs (2008). It was then used in 2009 public information film Cow.

References

External links 
List of recordings  at AllMusic

1941 songs
Songs with lyrics by Mack Gordon
Songs written for films
Songs with music by Harry Warren
Carmen Miranda songs
The Andrews Sisters songs